Lawrence Shulman (born May 17, 1937) is the former Dean of the University at Buffalo, The State University of New York.
His scholarship covers these subfields of social work: group work, supervision, child welfare, and teaching. Among his books are:
The Skills of Helping: Individuals, Families, Groups and Communities,
Interactional Supervision; and Mutual Aid Groups Vulnerable and Resilient Populations, and
The Life Cycle.

External links
School of Social Work.
The Skills of Helping: Individuals, Families, Groups and Communities;

1937 births
Living people
University at Buffalo faculty